Guy Harris "Doc" White (April 9, 1879 – February 19, 1969) was an American left-handed pitcher in Major League Baseball. He played for two teams, the Philadelphia Phillies and the Chicago White Sox, during his career which lasted from 1901 to 1913.

Early life
Born in Washington, D.C., "Doc" White was a graduate of the Georgetown University School of Dentistry. He started his professional baseball career in 1901 with the Phillies. In 1903, he jumped to the White Sox of the new American League.

Baseball career

From 1903 to 1906, White won at least 16 games each year; his earned run average was in the league's top four each year, as well. He led the league in ERA in 1906 with a 1.52 mark and went 18–6. That year, the White Sox won the pennant and their first World Series. In Game 5, White recorded the first save in Series history.

The following season, White set a career-high in wins with 27. He pitched effectively for Chicago until 1912, had an off-year in 1913, and then went to the Pacific Coast League from 1914 to 1915.

Good hitter
He was a good hitting pitcher in his 13-year major league career, posting a .217 batting average (278-for-1283) with 147 runs, 2 home runs, 75 RBI, 32 stolen bases and drawing 147 bases on balls. White also played 85 games in the outfield and several games at first and second base.

Musician
White also gained some recognition as a composer, publishing at least four songs (such as bestseller "Little Puff of Smoke, Good Night" in 1910) with his co-writer Ring Lardner, who was a sportswriter in Chicago during that period.

Death
White died at age 89 in Silver Spring, Maryland, just eight months after witnessing Don Drysdale surpass his record of 45 consecutive scoreless innings on June 4, 1968.

He was the last surviving member of the 1906 World Champion Chicago White Sox.

See also
 List of Major League Baseball career ERA leaders
 List of Major League Baseball annual ERA leaders
 List of Major League Baseball annual wins leaders

References

External links

Five Consecutive Shutouts Record Still Held by White, by Harry Grayson, June 5, 1943

1879 births
1969 deaths
Major League Baseball pitchers
American League ERA champions
American League wins champions
Philadelphia Phillies players
Chicago White Sox players
Venice Tigers players
Vernon Tigers players
Dallas Giants players
Navy Midshipmen baseball coaches
Baseball players from Washington, D.C.
Georgetown University alumni